The Archdiocese of Moscow, also known as Archdiocese of the Mother of God at Moscow is a Latin Church ecclesiastical territory or archdiocese of the Catholic Church located in Moscow, in Russia.

History
 13 April 1991: Established as Apostolic Administration of European Russia from the Archdiocese of Mogilev and the Diocese of Tiraspol
 23 November 1999: Territory ceded to the new Apostolic Administration of Southern European Russia, centred in Saratov; remaining territory renamed Apostolic Administration of Northern European Russia
 11 February 2002: Promoted as Metropolitan Archdiocese of Mother of God at Moscow

Bishops

 Apostolic Administrator of Northern European Russia (Latin Church)
 Bishop Tadeusz Kondrusiewicz (13 April 1991 – 11 February 2002 see below)
 Archbishops of Mother of God at Moscow
 Archbishop Tadeusz Kondrusiewicz (see above 11 February 2002 – 21 September 2007), appointed Archbishop of Minsk-Mohilev, Belarus
 Archbishop Paolo Pezzi, F.S.C.B. (21 September 2007 - )

Auxiliary Bishops
 Clemens Pickel (1998-1999), appointed Apostolic Administrator of Southern European Russia {Russia Europea Meridionale}
 Nicolai Dubinin, O.F.M. Conv. (2020-)

Suffragan dioceses
 Saint Clement at Saratov
 Saint Joseph at Irkutsk
 Transfiguration at Novosibirsk

See also
Cathedral of the Immaculate Conception (Moscow)
Immaculate Conception Church, Perm
Immaculate Conception Church, Smolensk
List of Roman Catholic dioceses in Russia
Roman Catholicism in Russia
St. Nicholas' Church, Luga
St. Peter and St. Paul's Church, Tula
Transfiguration of the Lord Church, Tver

Sources
 GCatholic.org
 Catholic Hierarchy
(Both the above incorrectly claim that the territory of the Archdiocese was taken from that of the diocese of Vladivostok)

References

External links
 http://www.catedra.ru/ Moscow Immaculate Conception Catholic Cathedral
 http://www.cathseminary.ru/ Roman Catholic Seminary in Russia

Roman Catholic dioceses in Russia
Roman Catholic dioceses established in 1991
Christianity in Moscow
Roman Catholic dioceses and prelatures established in the 20th century
1991 establishments in Russia